The seventh season of Psych, containing 14 episodes, premiered on the USA Network in the United States on February 27, 2013. The primary run ended on May 29, 2013, but a television special, Psych: The Musical aired later in the year. James Roday, Dulé Hill, Timothy Omundson, Maggie Lawson, Corbin Bernsen, and Kirsten Nelson all reprised their roles as the main characters in the series.

Production
Steve Franks continued as showrunner of the series.  The song "I Know, You Know", performed by The Friendly Indians, continued to be used as the theme song for the show.

Psych was renewed for its seventh season on January 10, 2012. On April 6, 2012, Dulé Hill tweeted that filming for the season was to begin on April 23, 2012.

The previously announced musical episode, originally thought to be part of the sixth season, aired during the seventh as a two-hour event in December 2013. However, the episode was intended to occur in the middle of the season, and it suffers several continuity errors as a result. The season also contains episodes inspired by Clue and The Blair Witch Project; the Clue-based episode aired as the series' 100th.

Cast

James Roday continued to portray the fake psychic detective Shawn Spencer.  Dulé Hill appeared as Burton "Gus" Guster.  Timothy Omundson and Maggie Lawson portrayed detectives Carlton "Lassie" Lassiter and Juliet "Jules" O'Hara, respectively.  Corbin Bernsen continued as Henry Spencer, and Kirsten Nelson returns as SBPD Chief Karen Vick.

Kurt Fuller and Sage Brocklebank reprised their recurring roles as Woody the Coroner and Officer Buzz McNab, respectively. Ally Sheedy returned to the series in the musical episode as Mr. Yang Cybill Shepherd returned as Madeleine Spencer, Shawn's mother, while Kristy Swanson continued to portray Marlowe Viccellio, Lassiter's convict girlfriend (who is released and married to Lassiter during season seven). Max Gail, Arden Myrin, and Jerry Wasserman returned in the premiere, titled "Santabarbaratown 2", reprising their roles of Henry's shooter, stalker, and the shooter's accomplice, respectively, from the sixth season. The season had a Clue inspired 100th episode, with Curt Smith returning as himself. Parminder Nagra appeared in a recurring role as Rachael, a beautiful and charming woman for whom Gus falls; she is later revealed to be a single mother. Jeffrey Tambor appears in two episodes as Juliet's step-father, Lloyd French. Anthony Michael Hall appears as Harris Trout, a consultant hired by the mayor to increase efficiency at the SBPD. John Kapelos makes his first appearance as the Mayor of Santa Barbara. Other guest stars for the season included Rose Abdoo, Garcelle Beauvais, Rachel Blanchard, Barry Bostwick, Cocoa Brown, Cindy Busby, Jake Busey, Tate Ellington, Pete Gardner, Lauriane Gilliéron, Neil Grayston, Gregory Harrison, David Koechner, Christopher Lloyd, Lori Loughlin, Brooke Lyons, Jessica Makinson, Eddie Matos, Mike McGlone, Katy Mixon, Rebeka Montoya, Garrett Morris, Oliver Muirhead, Martin Mull, Josh Pais, Tony Plana, Kirsten Prout, Anthony Rapp, Kate Rogal, Ethan Sandler, Big Show, Joey Slotnick, Sebastian Spence, Mike Starr, Steve Valentine and Lesley Ann Warren.

Episodes

DVD release 
Psych: The Complete Seventh Season, consisting of 14 episodes, was released on DVD on October 8, 2013. The three-disc set is presented in anamorphic widescreen format, English Dolby Digital 5.1 surround sound, and with English subtitles. The bonus features of the set include a director's cut of the episode "100 Clues", deleted scenes; a gag reel, five video podcasts featuring producers, writers, and directors, and "Psychouts." The entire running time for the set is 10 hours, 13 minutes. The episode "Psych: The Musical" was released separately on DVD on December 17, 2013, just two days after airing.

Notes 

† denotes a two-hour episode (with advertisements).

References

Psych
2013 American television seasons